Viola jokes are jokes that are directed towards violas and viola players, thought to have originated in the 18th century. Violas at the time were mainly used for relatively easy parts and as accompaniment, rather than as solo instruments; violists were generally low-paid and of lower social standing.

A story from Italy in the early 1700s is thought to be the origin of many viola jokes:
The violinist Francesco Geminiani arrived in London in 1714, one of the many expatriate musicians who settled in England in the late seventeenth and early eighteenth centuries ... As a young man Geminiani was appointed head of the orchestra in Naples, where according to English music historian Charles Burney he was "so wild and unsteady a timist, that instead of regulating and conducting the band, he threw it into confusion", and was demoted to playing the viola.

Viola jokes take many different forms, some only understandable by musicians and those acquainted with musical terms, others requiring no specialist musical knowledge. Some jokes make fun of the viola itself while others make fun of violists, while some jokes are directed in the opposite direction: jokes about musicians who tell viola jokes.


See also
Drummer jokes

References

Further reading

 
 [Reprinted: ]

External links
 Violajoke.com | Viola Joke generator
 Viola Jokes | Viola Central
 Viola jokes, part 1, part 2, part 3
 https://www.public.asu.edu/~schuring/Misc./Viola.html
 https://bachtrack.com/feature-jokes-viola-month-september-2019

Professional humor
Joke cycles
Humor in classical music
Violas